The International 5.5 Metre class was created to yield a racing keel boat giving a sailing experience similar to that of the International 6 Metre Class, but at a lower cost.

The main class regulation is a restriction on a single quantity output from a formula involving the boat's rating length L, weight (expressed as a displacement D) and sail area S; the regulation states that the output of this formula must not exceed 5.500 metres. There is considerable scope for variations in design while still meeting this restriction, and as a result each 5.5 metre boat is unique.

If the design parameters of a proposed new boat result in a formula output exceeding 5.5 metres, then one or more of the parameters must be suitably adjusted. Performance data gained from testing models towed in a long water tank (referred to in yacht design as Ship model basin) can suggest optimal combinations of parameters.
The 5.5. metre rule is a variant of the International Rule (sailing) that was established already in 1907. The 5.5. is therefore closely related to larger metre boats such as the 6mR, 8mR and the 12mR.

Since 2010 the 5.5 Metre is one of the Vintage Yachting Classes at the Vintage Yachting Games.

History 

The 5.5-metre class was a redesign of the 6-metre class by Charles E. Nicholson in 1937. The first boats conforming to the 5.5-metre rule were built in 1949. There had been an earlier attempt to build a cheaper alternative to the Sixes. In 1929 the 5-metre class was established by the French "Union de Societes Nautique Francaise" and the class was accepted in London. It achieved a position as the smallest new international metre class and some hundreds boats were built. Nevertheless, the 5 metre never managed to achieve an Olympic status. The 5.5-metre class replaced it quickly and was raced in Olympics for first time in 1952 Summer Olympics in Helsinki. The Scandinavian Gold Cup has also been competed with 5.5m boats since 1953. 5.5 metre boats replaced the International 6-metre at the 1956 Olympic Games held in Melbourne, Australia.  The 5.5 metre participation in the Olympic sailing events continued at the 1960 Olympic Games and 1964 Olympic Games. During the 1960s it however began to draw similar criticism as preceding six-metre class - namely, increasing costs - and the boat lost Olympic status after 1968 Olympic Games, due to excessive design and building costs of one off boats, marking the end of development class keel boats in Olympic regattas.  However, the class remained active thereafter and 5.5-metre boats are still very actively raced.

The formula 
The measurement formula is given in the 2006 International Five Point Five Metre Rating Rules:

where
  = length for rating
  = measured sail area
  = displacement in cubic metres

Events

Olympic Games

World Championship

Vintage Yachting Games

Pan American Games

European Championships

Scandinavian Gold Cup

Class association 

The object of the International 5.5 Metre Class Association is to promote and develop 5.5 Metre racing throughout the World. The first President of the association was Mr. Owen Aisher.

Since the development of the class spanned more than half a century the early boats are not competitive to race against the modern designs. Therefore, the association made, in 2007, divisions in the class based upon age of the boat:
 Classic Fleet (Designs before 1970)
 Evolution Fleet
 Modern Fleet (Designs from 1994)
During major races there are separate trophies per fleet, however if a classic fleet boat beats the modern fleet, the classic fleet boat wins the modern fleet trophy.

References

External links
Official International 5.5 Metre Class
5.5m IC  World Championships
German 5.5m-Klassenvereinigung
Switzerland 5.5m-Klassenvereinigung
 A 5.5m about to be restored in Australia
 A 5.5m about to be restored in Australia (cont.)
The 5.5m World Fleet Online Database
  ISAF 5.5m Microsite Website
  ISAF Homepage

 
Development sailing classes
Olympic sailing classes
Keelboats